Jan Pike '   (born 10 February 1952) is a Paralympic equestrian competitor from Australia. She was born in Sydney, New South Wales.

Introduction to horseriding
Pike who has cerebral palsy quadriplegia, only started riding at the age of 27 when she took up the sport with Riding for the Disabled NSW and says, "The first time I sat in the saddle and experienced the freedom of movement I fell in love. While riding with RDA NSW, she competed in several State and National Championships. 

After leasing her own horse and beginning private lessons in 1999, she was selected to the Paralympic Squad.

Paralympic Participation

Athens 
Pike won a bronze medal at the 2004 Athens Games in the Mixed Dressage - Freestyle grade I event and a silver medal in the Mixed Dressage - Championship grade I event. Her horse for these events was named Dr Doulittle.

Hong Kong 
She was also a member of the Australian Paralympic Team at the 2008 Summer Paralympics, the equestrian events of which were held in Hong Kong.

Recognition
She is an Honorary Life member of Equestrian Australia. In June 2021, she was awarded Medal of the Order of Australia (OAM) for service to people with disability.

References

Paralympic equestrians of Australia
Equestrians at the 2004 Summer Paralympics
Equestrians at the 2008 Summer Paralympics
Paralympic silver medalists for Australia
Paralympic bronze medalists for Australia
Living people
Medalists at the 2004 Summer Paralympics
1952 births
Australian female equestrians
Paralympic medalists in equestrian
Girl Guiding and Girl Scouting
Recipients of the Medal of the Order of Australia
Scouting and Guiding in Australia